Adnan Osmanhodžić (born 24 May 1971) is a Bosnian retired  footballer. He was capped for Bosnia and Herzegovina.

Playing career

Club
He started his career with Sloboda Tuzla, before being loaned to lower-tier sides NK Bjelovar and Jedinstvo Kalesija. After the Bosnian war he moved to Germany where he played for Ingolstadt 04, before joining Italian side Triestina. He quickly returned home and again joined Sloboda Tuzla, whom he represented for five seasons. In 2000, he joined Bosnian Powerhouse FK Sarajevo, where he stayed for a further five seasons. He concluded his career with Sloboda in 2008.

International
He made his debut for Bosnia and Herzegovina in a June 1999 European Championship qualification match away against the Faroe Islands and has earned a total of 2 caps, scoring no goals. His second and final international was an August 1999 friendly match against Liechtenstein.

Managerial career
He had a short stint as Sloboda Tuzla manager in 2009.

References

External links

1971 births
Living people
Sportspeople from Tuzla
Association football midfielders
Yugoslav footballers
Bosnia and Herzegovina footballers
Bosnia and Herzegovina international footballers
FK Sloboda Tuzla players
NK Bjelovar players
FC Ingolstadt 04 players
U.S. Triestina Calcio 1918 players
FK Sarajevo players
NK Bratstvo Gračanica players
Yugoslav First League players
Oberliga (football) players
Serie C players
Premier League of Bosnia and Herzegovina players
Bosnia and Herzegovina expatriate footballers
Expatriate footballers in Germany
Bosnia and Herzegovina expatriate sportspeople in Germany
Expatriate footballers in Italy
Bosnia and Herzegovina expatriate sportspeople in Italy
Bosnia and Herzegovina football managers
FK Sloboda Tuzla managers